NA-45 (Tribal Area-VI) is a constituency for the National Assembly of Pakistan comprising mainly Lower Kurram Subdivision and Central Kurram Subdivision of Kurram District in Khyber Pakhtunkhwa province.

Members of Parliament

2002–2018: NA-38 (Tribal Area-III)

Since 2018: NA-45 (Tribal Area-VI)

Election 2002 

General elections were held on 10 Oct 2002. Munir Khan Orakzai an Independent candidate won by 6,619 votes.

Election 2008 

The result of general election 2008 in this constituency is given below.

Result 
Munir Khan Orakzai succeeded in the election 2008 and became the member of National Assembly.

Election 2013 

Due to the volatile security situation in the region the elections were not held for this constituency.

Election 2018 

General elections were held on 25 July 2018.

By-election 2021
The seat of NA-45 fell vacant after the demise of the JUI-F MNA Munir Khan Orakzai. This seat was won by PTI candidate Fakhar Zaman Khan in a February 2021 by-election.

By-election 2022 
A by-election was held on 30 October 2022 due to the resignation of Fakhar Zaman Khan, the previous MNA from this seat.

See also
NA-44 (Tribal Area-V)
NA-46 (Tribal Area-VII)

References

External links 
 Election result's official website

45
45